Tokneneng (or tukneneng) is a tempura-like Filipino street food made by deep-frying orange batter covered hard-boiled chicken or duck eggs.

A popular variation of tokneneng is kwek kwek. Kwek kwek is traditionally made with quail eggs, which are smaller, with batter made by mixing annatto powder or annatto seeds that have been soaked in water. Kwek kwek and tokeneneng are often falsely used interchangeably.

They are often sold by street food vendors around busy areas and are usually sold alongside fish balls, squid balls, and kikiam.

They are also usually served with either a non-spiced/spiced vinegar based dip, or a thick sweetened sauce which is made of flour, soy sauce, garlic, onions and sugar. 

The name tukneneng originated from the 1978 Pinoy komiks series Batute, illustrated by Vic Geronimo and created by Rene Villaroman. In the language of main character Batute, tukneneng means 'egg'.

See also
 Deep fried egg
 Fish ball
 Kikiam
 Isaw
 Scotch egg

References

Philippine cuisine
Street food
Egg dishes
Deep fried foods
Street food in the Philippines